Gwiazdowski (feminine Gwiazdowska) is a Polish surname. Notable people with the surname include:

Grzegorz Gwiazdowski (born 1974), Polish racing cyclist
Robert Gwiazdowski (born 1960), Polish jurist and economist
Tadeusz Gwiazdowski (1918–1983), Polish actor

Polish-language surnames